Black Warrant is an American action thriller film directed by Tibor Takács and starring Tom Berenger and Cam Gigandet.

Cast
Tom Berenger
Cam Gigandet
Jeff Fahey

Production
As of November 2021, the film is in post-production.

Release
In May 2022, it was announced that Saban Films acquired the rights to the film in North America, UK, Ireland, Spain, Australia, New Zealand, and South Africa.  The film was released in select theaters, on Demand and on digital platforms on December 9, 2022.

Reception
The film has a 20% rating on Rotten Tomatoes based on five reviews.  Jeffrey Anderson of Common Sense Media awarded the film one star out of five.

Julian Roman of MovieWeb gave the film a positive review and wrote, "Black Warrant shouldn't be this funny and entertaining. The standard save the world plot relies on impossible coincidences to fuel a second act twist that's completely unbelievable. You'd think that would disqualify the film as being another forgettable actioner. Imagine my surprise to be actually smiling when the credits rolled. Likable primary characters and a stable of interesting goons kept my attention throughout."

References

External links
 

Films about terrorism
Films directed by Tibor Takács